Shaun Wallis (born 19 January 1982 in born in London, England) is an ice hockey player who currently plays for the Romford Raiders in the English Premier Ice Hockey League.

External links
 
 

1982 births
Living people
English ice hockey forwards
Sportspeople from London